The Admiralty Court Act 1861 is an act of the Parliament of the United Kingdom. The act addresses the jurisdiction and practices of the High Court of Admiralty. The act received royal assent on 17 May 1861 and came into force on 1 June 1861.

Provisions
The provisions of the act include:
Allowed for claims for damage, cargo loss and rebuilding or repairing any ship to be taken to the Court.
Extending the provision of the Merchant Shipping Act 1854 in regards to salvage.
Extending the jurisdiction of the Court over ships in English or Welsh ports, British ships and ships in British waters.

Amendments
Section 16 of the Admiralty Court Act 1861 was repealed by the Administration of Justice Act 1964 by an amendment introduced in the House of Lords. The Lord Chancellor at the time, Baron Gardiner, said that "the section had not been invoked for a very long time" and that both the president of the Probate Division and the Admiralty registrar had "been consulted and agree that Section 16 is now obsolete".

See also
 Criminal Justice Act 1988

References

United Kingdom Acts of Parliament 1861
Law enforcement in the United Kingdom
1861 in British law